Birmingham, Sparkbrook was a parliamentary constituency centred on the Sparkbrook area of Birmingham.  It returned one Member of Parliament (MP)  to the House of Commons of the Parliament of the United Kingdom, elected by the first past the post system.

The constituency was created for the 1918 general election, and abolished for the 1997 general election, when it was partly replaced by the new Birmingham Sparkbrook and Small Heath constituency.

History

Boundaries 
1918–1950: Parts of the County Borough of Birmingham wards of Balsall Heath, Moseley and King's Heath, and Sparkbrook.

1950–1955: The County Borough of Birmingham wards of Balsall Heath, St Martin's and Deritend, and Sparkbrook.

1955–1983: The County Borough of Birmingham wards of Fox Hollies, Sparkbrook, and Sparkhill.

1983–1997: The City of Birmingham wards of Fox Hollies, Sparkbrook, and Sparkhill.

Members of Parliament 
The constituency's most high-profile MP was Roy Hattersley, who represented it for over 30 years and was Deputy Leader of the Labour Party under Neil Kinnock from 1983 to 1992. He retired in 1997 when the seat was abolished, its replacement being won by Roger Godsiff.

Elections

Election in the 1910s

Elections in the 1920s

Elections in the 1930s

Elections in the 1940s

Elections in the 1950s

Elections in the 1960s

Elections in the 1970s

Elections in the 1980s

Elections in the 1990s

References 

Parliamentary constituencies in Birmingham, West Midlands (historic)
Constituencies of the Parliament of the United Kingdom established in 1918
Constituencies of the Parliament of the United Kingdom disestablished in 1997